Skirwith is a village and former civil parish, now in the parish of Culgaith, in the Eden district, in the county of Cumbria, England. In 1931 the parish had a population of 227. On 1 April 1934 the parish was abolished and merged with Culgaith.

Skirwith is seven miles from Penrith in a generally north-easterly direction, on a minor road about a mile from Blencarn. Just to the south are remains of a priory, now incorporated in farm buildings.

Notable residents of Skirwith include the Franciscan missionary John Bradburne.

See also

Listed buildings in Culgaith

References

External links

 Cumbria County History Trust: Skirwith (nb: provisional research only – see Talk page)

Villages in Cumbria
Former civil parishes in Cumbria
Culgaith